Anacithara is a genus of sea snails, marine gastropod mollusks in the family Horaiclavidae.

This genus was previously classified under the subfamily Mangeliinae, but transferred to Crassispirinae by Kilburn in 1994  In 2011 it was brought into the family Horaiclavidae by Bouchet P., Kantor Yu.I., Sysoev A. & Puillandre N. in their publication "A new operational classification of the Conoidea"

Description
This genus consists of small claviform shells (3–10 mm) which resemble Eucithara Fischer, 1883 (family Mangeliidae) in their upper whorls and sculpture, but differ in their wide aperture, devoid of teeth on either side. The small, smooth and blunt protoconch consists of two whorls.

Species
Species in Anacithara include:
 
 Anacithara angulicostata Kilburn, 1994
 Anacithara angulosa (E. A. Smith, 1872)
 † Anacithara axialis (P. Marshall, 1918)
 Anacithara biconica Barros, Santana & Lima, 2015
 Anacithara biscoitoi Nolf & Swinnen, 2011
 Anacithara brevicostata Hedley, 1922
 Anacithara caelatura Hedley, 1922
 † Anacithara clifdenica Powell, 1942
 Anacithara conata (Hedley, 1909)
 Anacithara dulcinea (Melvill & Standen, 1895)
 † Anacithara errabunda Powell, 1942
 Anacithara exquisita Hedley, 1922
 † Anacithara finlayi Powell, 1942
 Anacithara goodingii (E. A. Smith, 1884)
 Anacithara hebes Hedley, 1922
 Anacithara hervieri Hedley, 1922
 Anacithara ione (Melvill & Standen, 1896)
 † Anacithara janjukiensis Powell, 1944
 Anacithara leptalea Hedley, 1922
 Anacithara levukensis (Watson, 1881)
 Anacithara lita (Melvill & Standen, 1896)
 Anacithara maltzani (Knudsen, 1952)
 Anacithara minutistriata (E. A. Smith, 1882)
 Anacithara modica (E. A. Smith, 1882)
 † Anacithara nana Powell, 1942
 Anacithara nanisca (Hervier, 1897)
 Anacithara naufraga (Hedley, 1909)
 Anacithara osumiensis (G. B. Sowerby III, 1913)
 Anacithara perfecta Kay, 1979
 Anacithara phyllidis (Hedley, 1922)
 Anacithara platycheila (E. A. Smith, 1882)
 Anacithara propinqua Hedley, 1922
 Anacithara punctostriata Bozzetti, 2009
 Anacithara pupiformis  Barros, Santana & Lima, 2015
 Anacithara pyrgoformis  Barros, Santana & Lima, 2015
 Anacithara querna (Melvill, 1910)
 Anacithara rissoina Hedley, 1922
 Anacithara robusta Hedley, 1922
 Anacithara simplex (Turton W. H., 1932)
 Anacithara stricta Hedley, 1922
 Anacithara subrissoina Kilburn, 1994
 Anacithara themeropis (Melvill & Standen, 1896)
 Anacithara tumida Hedley, 1922
 Anacithara undaticosta (Reeve, 1845)

Species brought into synonymy
 Anacithara alfredi (E. A. Smith, 1904): synonym of Pseudorhaphitoma alfredi (E. A. Smith, 1904)
 Anacithara amplexa (Gould, 1860): synonym of Guraleus amplexus (Gould, 1860)
 Anacithara pupiforme Barros, Santana & Lima, 2015: synonym of Anacithara pupiformis Barros, Santana & Lima, 2015
 Anacithara pyrgoforme Barros, Santana & Lima, 2015: synonym of Anacithara pyrgoformis Barros, Santana & Lima, 2015

References

External links
  Barros, José CN, Cesar AS Santana, and Silvio FB Lima. "Three new species of Anacithara from the Southwestern Atlantic Ocean, Brazil." SPIXIANA 38.1 (2015): 21-28

 
Gastropod genera